This is a list of football players who have played for Persepolis Football Club by decades.

World Cup Players

 1978 FIFA World Cup 
  Ali Parvin
  Javad Allahverdi

 1998 FIFA World Cup
  Ahmad Reza Abedzadeh
  Mehdi Mahdavikia
  Naeem Saadavi
  Afshin Peyrovani
  Nima Nakisa
  Reza Shahroudi
  Mehrdad Minavand

 2006 FIFA World Cup
  Javad Kazemian
  Mehrzad Madanchi

 2014 FIFA World Cup
  Jalal Hosseini
  Hossein Mahini
  Mehrdad Pooladi
  Reza Haghighi

 2018 FIFA World Cup
  Alireza Beiranvand
  Vahid Amiri

 2022 FIFA World Cup
  Alireza Beiranvand
  Morteza Pouraliganji
  Vahid Amiri
  Mehdi Torabi

Olympic Players

 1972 Olympics
  Ali Parvin
  Ebrahim Ashtiani
  Jafar Kashani
  Safar Iranpak
  Mahmoud Khordbin

 1976 Olympics
  Ali Parvin
  Bijan Zolfagharnassab
  Alireza Azizi

List of players
Notable players with at least three seasons at the club are listed according to the date of their first-team official debut for the club.

1 He is the biggest legend of the club. the club decided to retire the squad number 7 for many years in memory of him.
2 He died of heart attack in sleep at the age of 30. He was captain of Persepolis at the time. the club decided to retire the squad number 24 in memory of him.

List of foreign players
Bold players are/were National players.

1 He is dignasosed with Hepatitis B and had to leave Persepolis.
2 He only played 7 games in 2012 AFC Champions League.
3 Roberto Sousa & The Club reached agreement to terminate the contract because long term injury.
4 Kwon injured his ankle ligament, went to Korea for Treatment But released from club.

By nationality

By Confederation

By Position

Notes
A.  Hossein Kalani is top goal scorer of 1970–71 with 7 goals and 1971–72 with 12 goals.

B.  Safar Iranpak is top goal scorer of 1971–72 with 12 goals.

C.  Farshad Pious is top goal scorer of 1991–92 with 11 goals and 1994–95 with 20 goals.

D.  Ali Daei is top goal scorer of 2003–04 with 16 goals.

E.  Mohsen Khalili is top goal scorer of 2007–08 with 18 goals.

F.  Mehdi Taremi is top goal scorer of 2015–16 with 16 goals and 2016–17 with 18 goals.

G.  Ali Alipour is top goal scorer of 2017–18 with 19 goals.

players

Association football player non-biographical articles
Persepolis